Trumaine McBride (born September 24, 1985) is a former American football cornerback. He was drafted by the Chicago Bears in the seventh round of the 2007 NFL Draft. He also played for the Arizona Cardinals, and New Orleans Saints. He played college football at Mississippi.

Early years
McBride attended Clarksdale High School in Clarksdale, Mississippi and was a student and letterman in football. In football, he was selected All-America and to the Top 300 list by PrepStar magazine.

Professional career

Chicago Bears
The Chicago Bears selected McBride in the seventh round of the 2007 NFL Draft. He served as one of the team's reserve cornerbacks, behind Nathan Vasher and Charles Tillman, who had both been signed to multi-year contracts over the summer. McBride received playing time during week four, after Vasher sustained a groin injury that sidelined him for much of the 2007 season. McBride earned a starting role during week seven, after he established himself as one of the most consistent members of the Bears' already injury-depleted secondary.

After suffering a knee sprain in the 2009 season opener against the Green Bay Packers, McBride was waived/injured by the Bears and subsequently placed on injured reserve.

Arizona Cardinals
On January 22, 2010 McBride signed a one-year contract with the Arizona Cardinals.

Jacksonville Jaguars
On April 27, 2012, McBride was released by the Jaguars.

McBride re-signed with the Jaguars on July 30, 2012 and was later released on August 31.

New York Giants
He signed with the Giants on January 4, 2013.

On March 12, 2014, McBride was re-signed by the New York Giants.

References

External links
Jacksonville Jaguars bio
Arizona Cardinals bio
Chicago Bears bio

1985 births
Living people
Players of American football from Mississippi
American football cornerbacks
Ole Miss Rebels football players
Chicago Bears players
Arizona Cardinals players
Jacksonville Jaguars players
New York Giants players